On the Attack is the debut studio album by American dance artist and rapper Gillette and produced by 20 Fingers. It was released in late 1994 as Gillette's solo album, then on April 18, 1995, particularly in Poland and Germany, as the debut album of 20 Fingers, credited as 20 Fingers feat. Gillette and retitled On the Attack and More.

Background
On August 31, 1994, 20 Fingers released their controversial first single "Short Dick Man" featuring vocalist and rapper Gillette on Zoo Entertainment/SOS Records. After the song's massive global success, particularly in France where it was a number one hit for three weeks, the producers of 20 Fingers decided to release a full Gillette solo album, called On the Attack, in Brazil, Canada, Scandinavia, Australia, Japan, Portugal, Chile, South Korea, the U.S. and other selected countries, while in Poland and Germany, they released it as a 20 Fingers debut studio album, still credited as "20 Fingers feat. Gillette", retitled On the Attack and More, with altered cover art, including the bonus track and second single "Lick It", which features vocals from Roula. 20 Fingers continued to release second and third singles "Mr. Personality" and "You're a Dog" under the "20 Fingers feat. Gillette" brand in Poland and Germany, while as Gillette solo releases everywhere else.

Track listing

On the Attack
 "Mr. Personality" – 3:30 
 "I'm on the Attack" – 3:25 
 "Whatcha Gonna Do" – 3:17 
 "Short, Short Man" (aka "Short Dick Man (Radio Mix)") – 3:17 
 "Bad Boys" – 3:13 
 "Wanna Wild Thing" – 3:18 
 "You're a Dog" – 3:29 
 "Coochie Dance" – 4:06 
 "Pay Back" – 3:33 
 "Move Too Fast" – 3:47 
 "Short Dick Man" – 4:47

On the Attack and More
 "Lick It" – 4:14 
The tracks on On the Attack and More are slightly louder and slightly sped up.

Outtakes/leftover tracks
 "You Came Too Fast"
 Explicit version of "Move Too Fast", recorded as a dance version, but remains unreleased. Gillette performed the uncensored version live.

Personnel

Musicians
Gillette – vocals on tracks 1–11
Roula – vocals on track 12
Eric "Bam Bam" Cea – DJ/scratching on track 2
Greg Suran, Lenny Vertucci – guitars

Production
Produced by Charlie Babie, Manny Mohr, J. J. Flores and Onofrio Lollino
Recorded and engineered by Charles Macak and Larry Sturm
Mixed by Larry Sturm
Mastered by Mark Richardson

Charts

References

External links
"On The Attack And More" at Discogs

20 Fingers albums
1994 debut albums
1995 debut albums